B. grandiflora may refer to:
 Brunfelsia grandiflora, a flowering shrub in the nightshade family
 Breweria grandiflora, a synonym for Bonamia elegans

See also 
 Grandiflora (disambiguation)